Rubellatoma rubella, common name the reddish mangelia, is a species of sea snail, a marine gastropod mollusk in the family Mangeliidae.

Description
The length of the shell varies between 6 mm and 11 mm.

Distribution
R. rubella can be found in Atlantic waters, ranging from the coast of North Carolina south to Brazil.; in the Caribbean Sea and the Gulf of Mexico.

References

 Rosenberg, G., F. Moretzsohn, and E. F. García. 2009. Gastropoda (Mollusca) of the Gulf of Mexico, pp. 579–699 in Felder, D.L. and D.K. Camp (eds.), Gulf of Mexico–Origins, Waters, and Biota. Biodiversity. Texas A&M Press, College Station, Texas

External links
 
 

rubella
Gastropods described in 1851